Ulpha is a small village and civil parish in the Duddon Valley in the Lake District National Park in Cumbria, England. Historically in Cumberland, it forms part of the borough of Copeland. At Ulpha a road leaves the Duddon Valley to cross Birker Fell to the valley of Eskdale. In the 2001 census the parish had a population of 159, reducing at the 2011 Census to 128.

The name Ulpha is believed to have originated with the meaning of 'hill frequented by wolves'. The name was derived from the Old Norse words ulfr meaning wolves and haugr meaning hill.

See also

Listed buildings in Ulpha
Listed buildings in Dunnerdale-with-Seathwaite

References

External links

 Cumbria County History Trust: Ulpha (nb: provisional research only – see Talk page)
Local community website

Villages in Cumbria
Borough of Copeland
Civil parishes in Cumbria